Malediction and Prayer is a live performance album by avant-garde musician Diamanda Galás, released on 8 May 1998 by Asphodel and Mute Records. It features recordings from her concert tour "Malediction and Prayer: Concert for the Damned" between 1996 and 1997.

Track listing

Personnel
Diamanda Galás — vocals, piano, production

Production and additional personnel
Blaise Dupuy — engineering
Xopher Davidsonv— mixing, mastering
Alex Oropeza — mixing
Michael Halsband — photography
Rex Ray — design

Release history

References

External links 
 

Diamanda Galás albums
1998 live albums
Mute Records live albums